The 1951 Detroit Titans football team represented the University of Detroit in the Missouri Valley Conference (MVC) during 1951 college football season. The team compiled a 4–7 record (2–4 against conference opponents), tied for fifth place in the MWC, and was outscored by opponents by a combined total of 263 to 156.

In February 1951, Dutch Clark, later inducted into both the Pro and College Football Halls of Fame, was hired as the school's athletic director and head football coach. He had served as the team's backfield coach under head coach Chuck Baer in 1951.

Schedule

See also
 1951 in Michigan

References

External links
 1951 University of Detroit football programs

Detroit
Detroit Titans football seasons
Detroit Titans football
Detroit Titans football